Loxostege triselena is a moth in the family Crambidae. It was described by Edward Meyrick in 1937. It is found in the Democratic Republic of the Congo.

References

Moths described in 1937
Pyraustinae
Moths of Africa